The 57th edition of the 2011 Vuelta a Andalucía is the 16th race of the 2010-2011 UCI Europe Tour. The race started on 20 February and finished on 24 February.

Teams
There are 18 teams taking part in the 2011 Vuelta a Andalucía. Amongst these are nine UCI ProTour teams, six UCI Professional Continental teams, and two Continental teams. Each team was allowed seven riders on their squad, giving the event a peloton of 126 cyclists at its outset.

The 18 teams in the race were:

UCI ProTour Teams

UCI Professional Continental Teams

UCI Continental Teams

Stages

Prologue
 20 February 2011, Benahavís (Prologue)

Stage 1
21 February 2011 – Almuñécar to Adra,

Stage 2
22 February 2011 – Villa de Otura to Jaén,

Stage 3
23 February 2011 – La Guardia de Jaén to Córdoba,

Stage 4
24 February 2011 – Córdoba to Antequera,

Classification leadership
In the 2011 Vuelta a Andalucía, four different jerseys were awarded. For the general classification, calculated by adding each cyclist's finishing times on each stage, and allowing time bonuses for the first three finishers on each stage and in intermediate sprints, the leader received a red jersey. This classification was considered the most important of the Vuelta a Andalucía, and the winner is considered the winner of the Vuelta.

Additionally, there was a sprints classification, which awarded a white jersey. In the sprints classification, cyclists got points for finishing in the top three in an intermediate sprint. The first across the sprint points got 3 points, the second got 2, and the third got a single point.

There was also a mountains classification, which awarded a black and white jersey. In the mountains classification, points were won by reaching the top of a mountain before other cyclists. Each climb was categorized, with the more difficult climbs awarding more points.

The points classification awarded a blue jersey. In the points classification, cyclists got points based on the order at the finish line of each stage. The stage win afforded 25 points, second on the stage was worth 20, third 16, fourth 13, fifth 10, sixth 8, seventh 6, eighth 4, ninth 2, and tenth was worth a single point. The points awarded in the sprints classification counted equivalently for this classification.

There was also the combination classification. This was calculated by adding the rankings in the general, points and mountains classifications; the cyclist with the lowest combined ranking was the leader in the combination classification.

There were also two classifications to this race for the best Spanish and Andalucian rider, based on their time in the general classification. However, no jerseys were awarded to the last three classifications, since the UCI limits the amount of rewarded jerseys to four per race.

The race also awarded a teams classification, which, too, was not represented by a jersey. The teams classification was calculated by adding the times of each team's best three riders per stage per day.

References

2011
2011 in Spanish road cycling
2011 UCI Europe Tour